PIX can refer to:
Cisco PIX, an IP firewall and NAT appliance
PIX (Microsoft)
PIX Publishing, a defunct photo bureau 
Pix (electronic payment system)
Plan It X Records
Sony PIX, Sony Pictures Entertainment's Hollywood movie channel in India
Pico Airport
WPIX, a television station in New York City known on air as "PIX 11"

See also 
 PIIX